Tommy Dixon (8 June 1929 – 6 February 2014) was an English footballer who played as a centre forward.

Club career
Dixon played for West Ham United between 1952 and 1955. He was the club's top scorer during the 1953-54 season with 19 goals, but only featured four times the following season. He moved to Reading, then of the Third Division South, and was their top scorer two years running. He later played for Brighton & Hove Albion, Workington and Barrow.

References

1929 births
2014 deaths
Footballers from Newcastle upon Tyne
English footballers
Association football forwards
West Ham United F.C. players
Reading F.C. players
Brighton & Hove Albion F.C. players
Workington A.F.C. players
Barrow A.F.C. players
English Football League players